David Checa (born 20 April 1980) is a Spanish professional motorcycle road racer. He is four time FIM Endurance World Champion, winning the title in 2004, 2014, 2016-2017 and 2018-2019. In 2016 he was the French Superbike Champion. He previously competed for two years in the Superbike World Championship. He currently competes in the FIM Endurance World Championship aboard a Kawasaki ZX-10R and the RFME Superstock 1000 Championship aboard a Yamaha YZF-R1. He's a triple winner of the 24 Hours Moto of Le Mans endurance race, in 2005 and 2017 on Yamaha and in 2019 with Kawasaki. He also won the Bol d'Or 24-hour motorcycle endurance race twice on Circuit Paul Ricard. In 2007 and 2017 both on a Yamaha.

Career

Early years
Born in Sant Fruitós de Bages, Barcelona, Spain, Checa began racing since 1996, contesting Superbike World Championship and Supersport World Championship races at home and in Europe. He spent - racing in the 250cc World Championship with a best overall finish of 13th before moving to Endurance World Championship. He signed up for the Supersport World Championship Le Mans 24 winner and master endurance winner in 2005 and 3 races in MotoGP in place of injured Toni Elias. , but broke a wrist pre-season, he finished 11th overall. He continued in the Supersport World Championship for  finishing 12th overall. He also won the 2007 Bol d'Or 24-hour endurance race.

Superbike World Championship
David raced in the World Superbike Championship for two years, without a great deal of success collecting only a handful of points in each season.

Personal life
He is the brother of motorcycle rider Carlos Checa.

Career statistics

Supersport World Championship

Races by year
(key) (Races in bold indicate pole position, races in italics indicate fastest lap)

Grand Prix motorcycle racing

Races by year
(key) (Races in bold indicate pole position, races in italics indicate fastest lap)

Superbike World Championship

Races by year
(key) (Races in bold indicate pole position) (Races in italics indicate fastest lap)

References

1980 births
Living people
Spanish motorcycle racers
Motorcycle racers from Catalonia
250cc World Championship riders
Superbike World Championship riders
Supersport World Championship riders
Sportspeople from Barcelona
Tech3 MotoGP riders
MotoGP World Championship riders